Urbano Cairo (born 21 May 1957) is an Italian businessman and chairman of Torino F.C.

Cairo is a native of Milan. His principal business interest is in Cairo Communication, a business which he founded. At as mid-2016, Cairo via U.T. Communications and UT Belgium Holding, owned 50.1% stake in Cairo Communication. U.T. Communications was also the parent company of Torino F.C. Cairo is also the president of RCS MediaGroup 56% share. In 2021, RCS lost the battle with Blackstone on the sale of building in Milan.

Notes

1957 births
Living people
People from Alessandria
Italian publishers (people)
Italian football chairmen and investors
Torino F.C. presidents